St. Anthony's Shrine is a unique place of worship as it shares the maritime borders of two countries, India and Sri Lanka, and is a declared holy place by Sri Lanka. This island is also spelled as Kachchatheevu or Katchatheevu.

History
St. Anthony's Catholic Shrine was dedicated in 1905, called in Tamil as Anthoniyar Koil (புனித அந்தோனியார் கோயில்), has over 100 year old traditions, and was built by an Indian Catholic-Srinivasa Padaiyatchi, Ramnad Catholic diocese, on this uninhabited island. This church is dedicated to Anthony of Padua, the patron saint of fishermen. No one was required to possess Indian passport or Sri Lankan visa for visiting Kachchatheevu.

Jaffna Bishop Justin Gnanapragasam holds the administration responsibilities of this church.

Annual festival
In 2012, its recorded that as many as 3,768 pilgrims including 875 women on Saturday began their journey to attend St. Antony's Church festival here. According to sources, in 2012, as many as 35 country boats and 106 mechanised boats ferried the pilgrims, mostly from Rameswaram, Thangatchimadam and Mandapam.

Indo-Sri Lankan Relationship through this festival

Permission to visit Kachchatheevu has been given to pilgrims after a gap of 27 years, since 1982. The festival which runs for 3 days remains as an umbilical cord for the Indo-Sri Lankan relationship. The priests from both India and Sri Lanka conduct the mass and car procession. As many as 35 country boats and 106 mechanised boats ferried the pilgrims, mostly from Rameswaram. The theme of year 2012 joint prayer by Tamil Nadu and Jaffna Catholic Church was, war-torn Sri Lankan Tamils on either side of the Palk strait reunite with their relatives.

This festival also gives the participants an opportunity to share hopes and renew with tradition, in an area shared harmoniously by people from both countries.

There is not a drop of drinking water on the island and the only structure is a decrepit church named after St. Antony, patron-saint of seafarers, to whom the feast is dedicated. 
It was put up by a prosperous fisherman in the early 20th century. But there is no shelter, no food, and nothing to sight-see, except the choppy blue waters of the Palk Straits all round.

Electricity, security, food, infrastructure, and internal transport for the devotees were all handled by the Sri Lanka Navy. It had also deployed lifeguards and medical teams for the convenience of the devotees.

Controversy
Indian flags were not allowed to be carried during the festival. The fishermen boats, which had been allowed to carry the pilgrims, could not fix the Indian flags in their boats for identification. There is also a diplomatic worry, that the illegal immigrants use this festival to get transit to Sri Lanka or India, illegally.

External links
 http://www.frontlineonnet.com/fl1915/19150680.htm
 http://www.nation.lk/edition/undo/item/3682-feast-at-kachchatheevu.html 
 http://www.adaderana.lk/news.php?nid=17111
 http://www.thehindu.com/todays-paper/tp-national/tp-tamilnadu/article2962036.ece?css=print
 http://www.tamilnewsnetwork.com/2012/03/07/tamil-nadu-catholic-church-reminds-umbilical-code-relations-at-kachchatheevu-fete/

References 

 http://www.island.lk/index.php?page_cat=article-details&page=article-details&code_title=46702

Churches in Jaffna District
Roman Catholic churches in the Diocese of Jaffna